Maga or MAGA may refer to:

MAGA
  Make America Great Again, a political slogan famously used by Donald Trump
  Museo MAGA, a modern-art museum in Gallarate, Italy
 maga, the logo of the Cornish Language Partnership, an organisation promoting the use of the Cornish language

Botany 
Trees in the family Malvaceae of the rosids clade, referred to as maga, include:
 Genus Thespesia
 Species Thespesia grandiflora

People
 Maga (footballer, born 1996), Brazilian women's football forward
 Maga (footballer, born 1999), Portuguese football defender
 Miguel Maga (born 2002), Portuguese football right-back

Other uses
 Maga (name)
 Maga, Cameroon, a commune
 Maga (aka Blackwood's Magazine), 19th- and 20th-century British magazine
 Krav Maga, an Israeli hand-to-hand self-defense system
 Maga Brahmins, or Sakaldwipiya, Indian priests, and Ayurveda teachers and practitioners
 Maga, an Egyptian crocodile deity sired by Set.

See also
 Magaly (disambiguation)
 Magas (disambiguation)
 Magha (disambiguation)
 Mega (disambiguation)